Kennewick School District # 17 is the largest employer in the city of Kennewick, Washington. The school district runs 17 elementary schools, five middle schools, and three high schools. 

The school district's superintendent, Traci Pierce, has been serving since January 2020.

Schools

Elementary schools

 Amistad
 Amon Creek
 Canyon View
 Cascade
 Cottonwood
 Eastgate
 Edison
 Fuerza
 Hawthorne
 Lincoln
 Ridge View
 Sage Crest
 Southgate
 Sunset View
 Vista
 Washington
 Westgate

Middle schools
 Chinook
 Desert Hills
 Highlands
 Horse Heaven Hills
 Park

High schools
 Delta in Pasco (in partnership with the Pasco and Richland School Districts)
 Kamiakin in northwest Kennewick
 Kennewick in eastern Kennewick
 Southridge in southwest Kennewick
 Phoenix in eastern Kennewick.

Technical schools

 Tri-Tech Skills Center

Former schools

 Fruitland Elementary School

Fruitland Elementary is currently used and has been used for several years to temporarily house district programs and as a temporary home for other district schools under remodel. It will be the home of Ridge View Elementary beginning in the 2022-23 school year as that school is remodeled.

See also
 Neil F. Lampson Stadium
 KTCV

References

External links 
 Kennewick School District website
 Kennewick School District WASL scores

School districts in Washington (state)
Kennewick, Washington
Education in Benton County, Washington